The following lists the top 25 albums of 2003  in Australia from the Australian Recording Industry Association (ARIA) End of Year Albums Chart.

Peak chart positions from 2003 are from the ARIA Charts, overall position on the End of Year Chart is calculated by ARIA based on the number of weeks and position that the records reach within the Top 100 albums for each week during 2003.

Notes

References

Australian record charts
2003 in Australian music
Australia Albums